Qafar (also known as Ghafr) is a village in Dalankuh Rural District, in the Central District of Faridan County, Isfahan Province, Iran. At the 2006 census, its population was 954, in 228 families.

References 

Populated places in Faridan County